The Pamantasan ng Lungsod ng Pasig (PLP) is a local university run by the Pasig city government in the Philippines.

History

The school was conceived by former Mayor Vicente C. Eusebio, with the approval and subsequent implementation of the Local Government Code (R.A.7160).

References

 
Universities and colleges in Pasig
Local colleges and universities in Metro Manila